Joan Cook (born October 6, 1934) was a Canadian Senator for Newfoundland and Labrador.

Biography
Cook was born in English Harbour West, Dominion of Newfoundland. In her working life, Cook was, variously, a businesswoman who served as vice-president of her family's automobile dealership, Cook and Jones Motors, an executive with CJON radio and television, and an executive with Robert Simpson Eastern Ltd.

Cook has also been heavily involved with charitable efforts, chairing fundraising campaigns for Newfoundland's branch of the Canadian Cancer Society. Cook also served on the board of directors for Newfoundland and Labrador's Pottle Center for mental health.

After twice running unsuccessfully as a Liberal candidate in the 1993 and 1996 Newfoundland and Labrador general elections, Cook was appointed to the Senate of Canada by Governor General Roméo LeBlanc on March 6, 1998, on the advice of Liberal Prime Minister Jean Chrétien.
As a senator, Cook served on many committees, such as the senate committee on Fisheries and Oceans. Cook also served as opposition whip of the senate from 2005 to 2007. 

Due to the mandatory retirement age for Canadian Senators, Cook resigned from her appointment as Newfoundland and Labrador Senator on October 6, 2009.

Electoral history

External links

 Liberal Senate Forum

1934 births
Canadian senators from Newfoundland and Labrador
Women members of the Senate of Canada
Liberal Party of Canada senators
Living people
People from Newfoundland (island)
Women in Newfoundland and Labrador politics
21st-century Canadian politicians
21st-century Canadian women politicians